Ryan is an English-language given name of Irish origin. Traditionally a male name. It comes from the Irish surname Ryan, which in turn comes from the Old Irish name Rían or Rian. Popular modern sources typically suggest that the name means "little king" or "illustrious", but the original meaning is unknown. According to John Ryan, Professor of Early and Medieval History at University College Dublin, "Rian, like Niall, seems to be so ancient that its meaning was lost before records began."

Popularity

Ireland
The popularity of "Ryan" as a name for newborn children in Ireland was ranked at No. 10 in 2005 and No. 14 in 2006. By 2021, the traditional Irish spellings of the name, Rían and Rian, had overtaken Ryan in popularity on the Irish charts.

United Kingdom
In Scotland, "Ryan" was the most popular name given to newborn boys every year from 1994 to 1998. This increase in popularity is fairly recent as records show that "Ryan" was barely in use in 1900, then was later ranked between No. 100 and No. 250 in 1950, and finally climbed to No. 64 in 1975.

In Northern Ireland, "Ryan" did not appear in the top ten most common male names for newborns in 1975, but was in the top five from 2000 to 2003.

In England and Wales, records suggest less popularity for the name than in other parts of the UK, ranking at No. 21 in 2003 and 2004 before dropping to No. 25 from 2005 to 2007.

United States
"Ryan" appeared in the top 20 male given names in the U.S. for 30 years between 1976 and 2006, having previously appeared in the top 1,000 for the first time in 1946 before steadily gaining popularity over the next three decades. The name gained popularity for girls in the 1970s, having first appeared in this capacity in the top 1,000 in 1974, and has remained in the top 1,000 since then; in 2018, it was ranked at No. 364 on a list of the most popular girls' names.

List of people with the given name Ryan

Male 
Ryan Adams (born 1974), American musician
Ryan Adams (born 1993), American rapper
Ryan Adeleye (born 1985), Israeli-American professional soccer defender who has played for Hapoel Ashkelon
Ryan Aguilar (born 1994), American baseball player
Ryan Amador, American singer-songwriter and LGBT rights advocate
Ryan Anderson (disambiguation), multiple people
Ryan Anthony (1969–2020), American trumpet player
Ryan Bailey (disambiguation), multiple people
Ryan Bastinac (born 1991), Australian rules footballer
Ryan Bates (born 1997), American football player
Ryan Battaglia (born 1992), Australian professional baseball player
Ryan Bell (disambiguation), multiple people
Ryan Benjamin (disambiguation), multiple people
Ryan Bertrand (born 1989), English professional association football player
Ryan Bethea (born 1967), American football player
Ryan Blaney (born 1993), American professional stock car racing driver
Ryan Borucki (born 1994), American baseball player
Ryan Brasier (born 1987), American baseball player
Ryan Braun (born 1983), American All-Star Major League Baseball player
Ryan Briscoe (born 1981), Australian-American professional racing driver
Ryan Broekhoff (born 1990), Australian basketballer
Ryan Brooks (born 1988), American basketballer
Ryan Burr (born 1978), American sports television journalist
Ryan Burr (baseball) (born 1994), American baseball player
Ryan Cabrera (born 1982), American pop rock singer and musician
Ryan Cartwright (born 1981), English actor
Ryan Castellani (born 1996), American baseball player
Ryan Choi (fencer) (born 1997), Hong Kong fencer
Ryan Choi (musician) (born 1984), composer and multi-instrumentalist
Ryan Christenson (born 1974), American baseball player and coach
Ryan Conbeer (born 1999), Welsh rugby union player
Ryan Connelly (born 1995), American football player
Ryan Coogler (born 1986), American director
Ryan Coughlin (born 1973), Canadian football player
Ryan Dalziel (born 1982), British professional racing driver
Ryan Davies (1937–1977), Welsh Entertainer
Ryan Davies (cricketer) (born 1981), English cricketer
Ryan Davis (disambiguation), multiple people
Ryan de Villiers (born 1992), South African actor
Ryan Dillon (born 1988), American puppeteer
Ryan Donaldson (born 1991), English footballer
Ryan Drummond (born 1973), American voice actor, actor, singer and comedian
Ryan Dull (born 1989), American professional baseball player
Ryan Dunn (1977–2011), American actor in TV show Jackass and stuntman
Ryan Edmondson (born 2001), English footballer
Ryan Eggold (born 1984), American actor
Ryan Eigenmann (born 1978), Filipino actor
Ryan Esson (born 1980), Scottish goalkeeper
Ryan Evans, basketball player
Ryan Feltner (born 1996), American baseball player
Ryan Finley (American football) (born 1994), American football player
Ryan Fitzpatrick (born 1982), American football player
Ryan Flaherty (born 1986), American baseball player and coach
Ryan Fuller (born 1990), American baseball coach
Ryan Fulton (born 1996), Scottish footballer
Ryan Getzlaf (born 1985), Canadian ice hockey player
Ryan Giggs (born 1973), Welsh football manager and former player
Ryan Glasgow (born 1993), American football player
Ryan Gosling (born 1980), Canadian actor
Ryan Hale (born 1975), American football player
Ryan Hall (disambiguation), multiple people
Ryan Harris (disambiguation), multiple people
Ryan Harrison (disambiguation), multiple people
Ryan Harwood (born 1991), Australian rules footballer
Ryan Hayes (disambiguation), multiple people
Ryan Helsley (born 1994), American baseball player
Ryan Hendrix (born 1994), American baseball player
Ryan Higa (born 1990), American YouTuber
Ryan Howard (born 1979), American All Star Major League Baseball player
Ryan Hunter-Reay (born 1979), American professional racing driver
Ryan Izzo (born 1995), American football player
Ryan Jeffers (born 1997), American baseball player
Ryan Jimmo (1981–2016), Canadian mixed martial arts fighter
Ryan Johnson (disambiguation), multiple people
Ryan Jones (disambiguation), multiple people
Ryan Kalil (born 1985), American football player
Ryan Kalish (born 1988), American Major League Baseball player
Ryan Kelly (singer) (born 1978), Northern Irish singer
Ryan Kent (born 1996), English footballer
Ryan Kerrigan (born 1988), American football player
Ryan Kesler (born 1984), American ice hockey player
Ryan Kreidler (born 1997), American baseball player
Ryan Lavarnway (born 1987), American Major League Baseball player
Ryan Leaf (born 1976), American football player
Ryan Lee (disambiguation), multiple people
Ryan Lester (born 1992), Australian rules footballer
Ryan Lewis (born 1988), American musician
Ryan Lexer (born 1976), American-Israeli basketball player
Ryan Lochte (born 1984), American swimmer
Ryan Longwell (born 1974), American football player
Ryan Malone (born 1979), American ice hockey player
Ryan Marks, American men's college basketball coach
Ryan Martinez (born 1987), American mixed martial artist
Ryan Martinie (born 1975), American musician
Ryan McCann (born 1981), Scottish footballer
Ryan McCollum (born 1998), American football player
Ryan McCurdy (born 1991), Northern Irish footballer
Ryan McKenna (baseball) (born 1997), American baseball player
Ryan McKenna (politician) (born 1973), American politician in Missouri
Ryan McKenna (filmmaker), Canadian filmmaker
Ryan McMahon (disambiguation), multiple people
Ryan Merriman (born 1983), American actor
Royce da 5'9" (born Ryan Daniel Montgomery in 1977), American rapper and songwriter
Ryan Moore (disambiguation), multiple people
Ryan Morgan (born 1990), Australian Rugby league player
Ryan Mountcastle (born 1997), American baseball player
Ryan Nall (born 1995), American football player
Ryan do Nascimento Ramos (born 1992), Brazilian footballer, known simply as Ryan
Ryan Navarro (born 1994), American football player
Ryan Neal (born 1995), American football player
Ryan Nelsen (born 1977), New Zealand footballer
Ryan Newman (born 1977), American professional stock car racing driver
Ryan Nielsen (born 1979), American football coach
Ryan Noda (born 1996), American professional baseball player
Ryan Ochoa (born 1996), American actor
Ryan O'Hearn (born 1993), American baseball player
Ryan O'Malley (born 1980), American Major League Baseball player
Ryan O'Malley (American football) (born 1993), American football player
Ryan O'Nan (born 1982), an American actor, writer, and director
Ryan O'Neal (born 1941), American television and film actor
Ryan Palmer, American professional golfer
Ryan Pardey (born 1979), American musician, singer, songwriter and DJ
Ryan Pepiot (born 1997), American baseball player
Ryan Phillippe (born 1974), American actor
Ryan Pickett (filmmaker), American film director
Ryan Potter (born 1995), American actor
Ryan Powell (disambiguation), multiple people
Ryan Preece (born 1990), American professional stock car racing driver
Ryan Pressly (born 1988), American baseball player
Ryan Ramczyk (born 1994), American football player
Ryan Reed (born 1993), American professional stock car racing driver
Ryan Spencer Reed (born 1979), American social documentary photographer
Ryan Reynolds (born 1976), Canadian-American actor
Ryan Max Riley (born 1979), American World Cup skier and humorist
Ryan Roberts (baseball) (born 1980), American Major League Baseball player
Ryan Ross (born 1986), American musician
Ryan Rowland-Smith (born 1983), Australian baseball player
Ryan Seacrest (born 1974), American radio and television personality
Ryan Searle (born 1989), Australian baseball player
Ryan Sheckler (born 1989), American professional skateboarder
Ryan Sherriff (born 1990), American Major League Baseball player
Ryan Sieg (born 1987), American professional stock car racing driver
Ryan Simpkins (rugby league) (born 1988), Australian Rugby League player
Ryan Sitton (born 1975), Texas politician
Ryan Skipper (1981–2007), American murder victim
Ryan Smyth (born 1976), former Canadian NHL ice hockey player
Ryan Star (born 1978), American singer-songwriter
Ryan Stiles (born 1959), American comedian
Ryan Switzer (born 1994), American football player
Ryan Tafazolli (born 1991), English footballer
Ryan Tannehill (born 1988), American football player
Ryan Taylor (disambiguation), multiple people
Ryan Tedder (born 1979), American singer, songwriter, multi-instrumentalist and producer
Ryan ten Doeschate (born 1980), Dutch cricketer
Ryan Tepera (born 1987), American baseball player
Ryan Thomas (born 1984), English actor
Ryan Thompson (disambiguation), multiple people
Ryan Truex (born 1992), American professional stock car racing driver
Ryan Tubridy (born 1973), Irish broadcaster
Ryan Turell (born 1999), American professional basketball player
Ryan Van Dyke (born 1980), American football player
Ryan Vilade (born 1999), American baseball player
Ryan Walter (born 1958), Canadian former professional ice hockey player
Ryan Waters, American mountaineer, guide, polar adventurer and speaker
Ryan Weathers (born 1999), American baseball player
Ryan Weber (born 1990), American baseball player
Ryan Wetnight (1970–2020), American football player
Ryan Wheeler (born 1988), American Major League Baseball player
Ryan White (1971–1990), American AIDS activist
Ryan Williams (disambiguation), multiple people
Ryan Winslow (born 1994), American football player
Ryan Yarbrough (born 1991), American baseball player

Female 
Ryan Michelle Bathe (born 1976), American actor
Ryan Carlyle (born 1989), American rugby sevens player
Ryan Destiny (born 1995), American singer and actor
Ryan Haddon (born 1971), American journalist and television producer
Ryan Ashley Malarkey (born 1986/1987), American tattoo artist
Ryan Newman (born 1998), American actor, singer, and model
Ryan Shamrock (born 1979), American professional wrestling valet
Ryan Starr (born 1982), American singer and actor
Ryan Torrero (born 1990), American-Chilean professional soccer goalkeeper and model.
Ryan Tyler (born 1973), American country music artist
Ryan Williams (disambiguation), multiple people

Non-binary 
Ryan Simpkins (born 1998), American actor

Fictional characters 
 Ryan, a young lion and Samson's son in the 2006 Disney animated film The Wild
Ryan Atwood, a troubled teenager on the television series The O.C.
Ryan Chappelle a government agent on the series 24
Ryan Hardy, former FBI agent on The Following
Ryan Howard (The Office), a character on The Office
Ryan Laserbeam, on True Jackson VP
Ryan Lavery, a father on the American daytime drama All My Children
Ryan O'Reily, an inmate on the prison drama Oz
Ryan Sinclair, a companion of the Thirteenth Doctor in the series Doctor Who
Ryan Spalding, a character in Grey's Anatomy, portrayed by Brandon Scott
Ryan Steele, from VR Troopers
Ryan Mitchell, from Power Rangers Lightspeed Rescue
Ryan Stone, an astronaut in the film Gravity
Ryan Wolfe, from CSI: Miami
Ryan Choi, from DC Comics
Ryan, a lion who is a popular figure of the Kakao Friends in South Korea
Ryan Wilder, the second Batwoman in the Arrowverse

Other 
Murder of Ryan Poston, a 2012 crime perpetrated by Shayna Hubers in Kentucky
Typhoon Ryan (1992), a Category 4 typhoon from August 30 to September 11

See also 
List of Irish-language given names
List of Scottish Gaelic given names
Rayan (Persian given name)
Rayan (disambiguation)
Rhyan, given name and surname

References 

Given names
English unisex given names
Irish masculine given names
Scottish masculine given names
Welsh masculine given names
Irish-language unisex given names
Lists of people by given name
English masculine given names

es:Ryan
fr:Ryan
ja:ライアン